Edmund Maurice Burke Roche, 4th Baron Fermoy (15 May 1885 – 8 July 1955) was a British Conservative Party politician who held a title in the Peerage of Ireland. He was the maternal grandfather of Diana, Princess of Wales.

Early life

Roche was born on 15 May 1885 in Chelsea, London. He was the elder of twin sons of the Hon. James Roche (later 3rd Baron Fermoy) and his American wife, Frances Ellen Work. The Roches separated in December 1886, with James Roche agreeing to relinquish custody of his sons to his wife's father, multi-millionaire stockbroker Frank Work, in exchange for Work paying Roche's debts. From his parent's marriage, he had an elder sister, Cynthia Roche (who married Arthur Scott Burden and, after his death, Guy Fairfax Cary).

He was educated at Harvard University and graduated in 1909. As a condition of their inheritance, Work stipulated that Maurice and his twin brother Francis "shall assume and retain the name 'Work' in place of the name 'Roche'", and must not travel to Europe or marry a European; Maurice ignored the edicts. Roche returned to England on succeeding to his father's Irish peerage in 1920. He was a naturalized American citizen, but resumed British nationality following his succession to the title.

Career
He rented Park House at Sandringham, Norfolk, from the royal family. At the 1924 general election, he contested and won the local parliamentary constituency, King's Lynn, holding the seat until he stood down at the 1935 general election. He was also elected the town's mayor in 1931.

Later life 
Lord Fermoy joined the Royal Air Force in 1939 at the start of World War II, but when the incumbent Member of Parliament (MP) for King's Lynn was killed on active service in 1943, he resigned his commission and stood for re-election. He retired from politics when Parliament was dissolved for the 1945 general election.

Lord Fermoy was a member of the shooting party organized by King George VI on 5 February 1952, on the grounds of Sandringham, which was the King's last full day alive.

Personal life 
On 17 September 1931, Lord Fermoy married Ruth Sylvia Gill at St. Devenick's, Bieldside, Aberdeenshire with a reception held at Dalhebity. Ruth was the youngest daughter of Ruth ( Littlejohn) Gill and Col. William Smith Gill Before his death, they were the parents of three children:

 The Hon. Mary Cynthia Roche (1934–2023), who married the Hon. Anthony Berry, a son of Gomer Berry, 1st Viscount Kemsley. They divorced in 1966 and she married Denis Geoghegan. They divorced in 1980 and she married Michael Gunningham. They divorced in 1989.
 The Hon. Frances Ruth Roche (1936–2004), who married John Spencer, Viscount Althorp. They divorced in 1969 and she married Peter Shand Kydd. They divorced in 1990.
 The Hon. Edmund James Burke Roche (1939–1984), later the 5th Baron Fermoy, who married Lavinia Pitman.

Lord Fermoy collapsed in a shop at King's Lynn, Norfolk, in June 1955 and died three weeks later. He was succeeded by his only son, Edmund.

Legacy
His life was the subject of the book Lilac Days, by Gavan Naden and Maxine Riddington (HarperCollins), where it was claimed he had a 30-year affair with an American, Edith Travis.

References

External links 
 

1885 births
1955 deaths
Military personnel from London
English twins
Harvard University alumni
Barons Fermoy
Maurice
English people of American descent
English people of Irish descent
Royal Air Force officers
Roche
Roche
Roche
Roche
Roche
UK MPs who inherited peerages
Royal Air Force personnel of World War II
People from Chelsea, London
Mayors of King's Lynn
English emigrants to the United States
People with acquired American citizenship